The following is a list of notable events and releases of the year 1965 in Norwegian music.

Events

May
 19 – The 15th Bergen International Festival started in Bergen, Norway (May 19 – June 5).

June
 The 2nd Kongsberg Jazz Festival started in Kongsberg, Norway.

July
 The 5th Moldejazz started in Molde, Norway.

Unknown date
Kirsti Sparboe wins the Melodi Grand Prix, singing "Karusell" by Jolly Kramer-Johansen.

Deaths

 May
 23 –  Helge Klæstad, judge and composer (born 1885).

 January
 11 –  Arne Bjørndal, hardingfele fiddler, composer and folklorist (born 1882).

Births

 February
 13 – Ole Mathisen, jazz saxophonist, clarinetist, and composer.
 24 – Tone Åse, jazz singer.
 27 – Malika Makouf Rasmussen, percussionist, bassist, guitarist, keyboardist, singer, composer and music producer.

 March
 12 – Liv Stoveland, soprano and singing teacher.
 21 – Kristin Mellem, violinist, composer, and orchestra conductor.

 June
 9 – Helge Sunde, trombonist, multi-instrumentalist, and composer.

 July
 16 – Odd André Elveland, jazz saxophonist and composer.
 28 – Roger Ludvigsen, Sami guitarist, percussionist, and composer.

 September
 24 – Njål Ølnes, jazz tenor saxophonist and composer.

 October
 9 – Geir Lysne, jazz saxophonist, composer, music arranger, conductor, and Big Band leader.

 Unknown date
 Helge Andreas Norbakken, percussionist.

See also
 1965 in Norway
 Music of Norway
 Norway in the Eurovision Song Contest 1965

References

 
Norwegian music
Norwegian
Music
1960s in Norwegian music